Wens Foodstuff Group is a Chinese food company specializing in pork production.

Overview 
Wens Foodstuff Group is a major pork producer. It is traded on the Shenzhen Stock Exchange (300498.SZ).

The company is also involved in the non-pork meat and dairy business.

History 
Wens Foodstuff Group, formerly known as Guangdong Wens Food Group, was founded in 1983.

In 2018 the company's 1.2 million sows produced 22.3 million hogs. In 2019 they were the largest pork producer in China.

Following the 2020 the African swine fever epidemic the company expanded aggressively building mega-farms with multistory pig barns. This growth was largely fueled by debt.

See also 
 Muyuan Foodstuff

References

External links 
 

Pig farming
Chinese companies established in 1983
Food and drink companies of China
Meat companies